The 1920 United States presidential election in Minnesota took place on November 2, 1920 as part of the 1920 United States presidential election in which all contemporary forty-eight states participated. Voters chose 12 electors, or representatives to the Electoral College, who voted for president and vice president. This election marks the last time a candidate for president won every county in Minnesota.

Background
The 1918 mid-term elections had seen the Midwestern farming community largely desert the Democratic Party due to supposed preferential treatment of Southern farmers: Democratic seats in the Midwest fell from thirty-four to seventeen, whilst Scandinavian-Americans were also vigorously opposed to entering the war. Moreover, Democratic fear of Communism seen in the Palmer Raids and "Red Scare" led to Cox, then Governor of Ohio, to ban German-language instruction in public schools in 1919. Much more critical for German-Americans was the view that outgoing President Woodrow Wilson was deliberately trying to punish Germany and Austria for starting the war, especially via his disregard for the United Kingdom's continuing blockade of Germany. Stressing Harding's German ancestry, the German press drummed up the view that 

As the campaign began after the Republican Party had nominated U.S. Senator Warren G. Harding of Ohio and the Democratic Party former Ohio governor James M. Cox, a further blow to the Democrats – who had never won Minnesota but came tantalizingly close in 1916 when they lost by one vote in 988 – occurred when the national economy suffered a major downturn following the wartime boom, resulting in plummeting agricultural prices that were especially problematic in the Midwest. Whereas Cox travelled throughout the nation apart from the "Solid South" during September, Harding, despite having four times the budget, campaigned from his home in Marion, Ohio. A poll by the giant Rexall drug store chain – which in 1916 had been accurate enough to predict Wilson's razor-thin wins in New Hampshire and California – suggested Harding would win 382 electoral votes, and at the end of October, although no more opinion polls had been published, most observers were even more convinced that the Republicans would take complete control of all branches of government.

Harding overwhelmingly carried Minnesota by a margin of 376,427 votes, or 51.16 points, and nationally won the election, with 404 electoral votes and a 26.17 point lead over Cox in the popular vote, which constitutes the most lopsided result in any United States presidential election held since James Monroe's uncontested re-election in 1820. Cox did not win a single state north of the Mason-Dixon line nor west of the Continental Divide. The percentage of Minnesota's popular vote won by Harding in 1920 is second only to Theodore Roosevelt's 74% of the state's popular vote from 1904, as Harding was helped by mass defection of registered Democratic German-Americans to the Republican ticket.

Harding became the second and last presidential nominee after Theodore Roosevelt in 1904 to sweep all Minnesota’s counties. This was the last time the Republicans won Red Lake County until George W. Bush in 2000 and the last time Mahnomen County voted Republican until Ronald Reagan in 1980.

The presidential election of 1920 is also noteworthy for the third party candidacy of the perennial Socialist candidate, Eugene V. Debs. Debs won nearly a million votes nationally, and 7.62 percent in Minnesota with second place ahead of Cox in six counties, despite the fact that he was incarcerated at the time. On September 12, 1918, Debs had been convicted on ten counts of sedition in relation to a speech he had given in Canton, Ohio on June 16, 1918, in which he encouraged conscientious objection to World War I. Of the five presidential elections in which Debs had been a candidate, 1920 was his second-greatest showing in terms of percentage of the popular vote won — he only did better in 1912. 1920 was also his final appearance on the ballot.

Results

Results by county

See also
 United States presidential elections in Minnesota

Notes

References

1920
Min
1920 Minnesota elections